Bertoloni is a surname. Notable people with the surname include:
 Antonio Bertoloni (1775–1869), Italian botanist with the botanical author abbreviation Bertol., father of Giuseppe
 Giuseppe Bertoloni (1804–1874), Italian botanist and entomologist with the botanical author abbreviation G.Bertol., son of Antonio

See also
 Bertol (surname)
 Bertoli
 Bertolo
 Bertolini

Surnames of Italian origin